Leszczyny may refer to the following places:
Leszczyny, Gorlice County in Lesser Poland Voivodeship (south Poland)
Leszczyny, Łódź Voivodeship (central Poland)
Leszczyny, Podlaskie Voivodeship (north-east Poland)
Leszczyny, Tatra County in Lesser Poland Voivodeship (south Poland)
Leszczyny, Kielce County in Świętokrzyskie Voivodeship (south-central Poland)
Leszczyny, Końskie County in Świętokrzyskie Voivodeship (south-central Poland)
Leszczyny, Subcarpathian Voivodeship (south-east Poland)
Leszczyny, Lipsko County in Masovian Voivodeship (east-central Poland)
Leszczyny, Szydłowiec County in Masovian Voivodeship (east-central Poland)